Ophir Kariv  is an Israeli diplomat, now serving as Israel's ambassador to Ireland.

Biography
Kariv was born in Haifa, Israel. He earned a B.A. in International Relations from the Hebrew University and an MBA from University of Haifa.

Diplomatic career
Kariv began his career with the Ministry of Foreign Affairs in 1994.  He was Director of the Department for Israeli Consulates in the United States and has also held roles in the Public Diplomacy Division and in the Human Rights and Humanitarian Affairs Department in the Ministry of Foreign Affairs. He has also been Deputy Head of Mission in Israel’s embassies in Bulgaria, Denmark and Thailand. Before moving to his role in Ireland, he was Director of the Northern Europe Department in Israel’s Ministry of Foreign Affairs.  

Kariv presented his credentials to the President of Ireland, Mr. Michael D. Higgins, on October 16, 2018, showing him to be Ambassador Extraordinary and Plenipotentiary of Israel to Ireland.  He participated in the "Holocaust Memorial Day Commemoration" where Michael D. Higgins, President of Ireland, was the keynote speaker on January 27, 2019.

References

Israeli Jews
Ambassadors of Israel to Ireland
Year of birth missing (living people)
Living people
Hebrew University of Jerusalem Faculty of Social Sciences alumni
University of Haifa alumni